Karim Zaoui (born 7 January 1970) is an Algerian football manager and the current head coach of Olympique de Médéa.

References

1970 births
Living people
Algerian football managers
NA Hussein Dey managers
JS Saoura managers
NC Magra managers
Algerian Ligue Professionnelle 1 managers
21st-century Algerian people